The 1885 Yale Bulldogs football team represented Yale University in the 1885 college football season. The Bulldogs finished with a 7–1 record. The team recorded six shutouts and outscored its opponents by a combined total of 366 to 11.  Its only loss was against rival Princeton by a 6–5 score.

Schedule

References

Yale
Yale Bulldogs football seasons
Yale Bulldogs football